Paroria may refer to:

 Paroria (fictional world), a RPG world in Minecraft
 Paroria (ancient city), an ancient city in Arcadia, Greece
 Paroria (region), a medieval monastic region
 Parori, a village in Arcadia, Greece